Mid Ulster District Council (Ulster-Scots: Mid Ulstèr Airts Cooncil) is a local authority that was established on 1 April 2015. It replaced Cookstown District Council, Dungannon and South Tyrone Borough Council and Magherafelt District Council. The first elections to the authority took place on 22 May 2014 and it acted as a shadow authority, prior to the creation of the Mid Ulster district on 1 April 2015.

Chairpersonship

Chair

Vice Chair

Councillors
For the purpose of elections the council is divided into seven district electoral areas (DEA):

Seat summary

Councillors by electoral area

† Co-opted to fill a vacancy since the election.‡ New party affiliation since the election.Last updated 7 January 2023

For further details see 2019 Mid Ulster District Council election.

Population
The area covered by the new Council has a population of 138,590 residents according to the 2011 Northern Ireland census.

References

District councils of Northern Ireland
Politics of County Londonderry
Politics of County Tyrone